Druzbha-78 was an U-18 ice hockey team based in Kharkiv, Ukraine.

Sexual abuse allegations and suicide 
In January 2012, the coach and owner of the team, Ivan Pravilov was accused of fondling a 14-year-old Ukrainian player whom he had invited to his home in Philadelphia, Pennsylvania. 

He was arrested, and placed in a Federal Detention Center. Days later he was found to be unresponsive at around 3:00 am; by 3:45, he was pronounced dead at a local hospital.  Evidence suggested that he had committed suicide by hanging in his jail cell. This was confirmed by the city medical examiner's office on 23 February 2012.

A former student of Druzhba-78 had claimed in January 2012 that Pravilov had physically and sexually abused members of Druzhba-78.

Notable NHL alumni 
  Dainius Zubrus
  Andrei Zyuzin
  Auston Matthews

See also
 Ivan Pravilov

References

External links
 Info about Druzhba 78 and Ivan Pravilov
  Info about Ivan Pravilov

Ice hockey teams in Ukraine
Sport in Kharkiv